Billericay is a town and civil parish in the Borough of Basildon, Essex, England. The town has three secondary schools and a variety of open spaces. It is thought to have been occupied since the Bronze Age.

Toponym 
The origin of the name Billericay is unclear. It was first recorded as "Byllyrica" in 1291. The urban settlement, which was within the manor and parish of Great Burstead, was one of many founded in the late 13th century in an already densely populated rural landscape. 
Several suggestions for the origin of the place name include:
 Villa Erica (Heather Villa), suggesting a Romano-British origin.
 bellerīca, a medieval Latin word meaning 'dyehouse or tanhouse'.
 billers, a traditional name for watercress, for which Bilbrook in Somerset and Staffordshire are named.  Watercress was farmed in Billericay springs during the 20th century.

Although the precise etymology of the name is not known, England has other places named Billerica:
 Billerica, Kent. A deserted town adjacent to the settlement of Court-up-Street by Port Lympne. Significantly this is adjacent to a Roman "Saxon Shore" fort as well as being on spring lines suitable for growing watercress.
 Billerica Farm, near Upton Noble, Somerset. Although this farm might be named after the other Billericas, the site is also close to springs suitable for farming watercress.

The Tudor antiquarian John Leland believed the already-abandoned Billerica in Kent was a variant of Bellocastrum, ‘fair castle’ in Latin. In Billericay there is a Roman fort at Blunt's Wall Farm; likewise ‘Burh’ gives its name to Great Burstead.
This suggests that a Romano-British place name was reused by the Anglo-Saxons following the end of Roman rule in Britain.

History

Some of the earliest records of human occupation of Billericay are the burial mounds in Norsey Wood, showing evidence of occupation in the Bronze and Iron Ages. Evidence of Roman occupation has been found at a number of locations in the town and there may have been a small cavalry fort at Blunts Wall.

The Saxons did not settle in the centre of Billericay. In the late 10th century, it was known as "Burhstede". Billericay was not mentioned in the Domesday Book of 1086, as it lay within Great Burstead. At this time, the parish church for Billericay was at Great Burstead.

Middle Ages

In the 13th and 14th centuries, some pilgrims to Canterbury journeyed via Billericay. Some of them may have spent the night in Billericay before crossing the River Thames at Tilbury. This may account for the large number of inns in the town.

Billericay's most notable historical episode was the Battle of Billericay during the Peasants' Revolt of 1381.

The Wycliffe preachers influenced the town. Four local people (Thomas Watts, Joan Hornes, Elizabeth Thackwell and Margaret Ellis) were burnt at the stake. Two other residents (Joan Potter and James Harris) were tortured for their Protestant  faith during the reign of Queen Mary.

Pilgrim Fathers
A meeting of the Pilgrim Fathers, prior to their sailing in the Mayflower, is said to have taken place in Billericay high street; many local names and much historical imagery reflect this, such as Mayflower House, Mayflower Morris Men, Mayflower Taxis, Mayflower School and Mayflower Hall. Sunnymede School's houses were called Mayflower, Pilgrim, Chantry.

Christopher Martin, who was born in Great Burstead and later became a Billericay goods merchant and property owner, travelled on the Mayflower in 1620 as the official Ship's Governor and purchasing agent, procuring ships supplies for the voyage.

The Mayflower ship set sail once the Pilgrim Fathers had all boarded and set to meet the Speedwell in the English Channel; the Speedwell was sailing from the Netherlands. Unfortunately the Speedwell developed leaks and so the ships headed for the Devon coast to repair her, but this proved impossible; the Mayflower eventually sailed from Plymouth without her.

Four people from Billericay were on board, including Christopher Martin, his wife Mary Prowe, along with Solomon Prowe - her son from her first marriage - and John Langemore - the Martins' servant. All four pilgrims perished  after their arrival at Cape Cod, Massachusetts. Christopher Martin died of fever on the 8th of January 1621. His wife perished in Plymouth in 1621. Both Christopher and Mary are buried in the Cole Hill Burial ground in Plymouth. The unfortunate fate of the would-be pioneers did not deter other inhabitants of Billericay from setting sail for the New World. The town of Billerica, Massachusetts was established in 1655 by colonists from Billericay and named after their hometown in England.

Georgian and Victorian eras

In the Georgian period many excellent examples of the period's houses were built in Billericay. One of those remaining today is Burghstead Lodge in High Street, which used to house the library. A number were demolished in the 1980s to make way for new developments, notable examples being on Western Road. 

In the town, the Union Workhouse was built in 1840 to continue to implement the Poor Law.  Parts of this building were later incorporated into what was St. Andrew's Hospital. 

The railway arrived in Billericay in 1889; the station is situated on a branch line from the Great Eastern Main Line between Shenfield and Southend-on-Sea.

20th century
In 1916, during the First World War, a German Zeppelin airship was shot down during an aerial battle over Billericay.  During its fiery demise, it narrowly missed the High Street, crashing into a field off Greens Farm Lane. A plaque was erected at the site in 2016, to commemorate 100 years since the incident. 
Parts of the aluminium frame can be seen at the Cater Museum in Billericay High Street.
Recent research has indicated that this may be identified with the 'ghost Zeppelin' of Tonbridge which was allegedly seen floating over that town earlier in the day.

St Andrew's Hospital, which was formerly the site of the town's Victorian workhouse, continued to function as an important communal building.  From 1973, it housed the internationally renowned Regional Plastic Surgery and Burns unit until this was relocated to Broomfield Hospital, Chelmsford in April 1998.  After the relocation, most of the hospital was redeveloped into housing. The listed buildings remain intact but are now residential.

Geography
 

Billericay is within the London Basin and lies on a mixture of London clay, Claygate Beds and Bagshot Beds.  Near the High Street, there is a change in soil type from sandy to clay, which gives rise to local underground springs. Open spaces include Norsey Wood, Mill Meadows Nature Reserve, Queen's Park Country Park, Sun Corner, and Lake Meadows. Hanningfield Reservoir and South Green are nearby. Billericay contains Billericay School, Mayflower High School and St John's School.

Mill Meadows is a local nature reserve near the centre of Billericay, one of the finest ancient meadow systems in Essex. Centuries of grazing have created the ideal conditions for a wonderful diversity of wild flowers, fungi, insects and invertebrates, many of which are very rare. It also contains an area of 16.63 acres (6.73 ha) that has been declared as a Site of Special Scientific Interest (SSSI) for its unimproved neutral grassland.

Governance
Between 1 July 1837 and 1 July 1939, Billericay was a registration district. Since 1974, the town has been part of the Basildon district. The registry office is located in Basildon, in the council offices. There is also the facility to register deaths in Basildon Hospital.

Parliamentary
Since major boundary changes in Essex for the 2010 general election, Billericay has been part of the parliamentary constituency of Basildon and Billericay, whose MP is John Baron of the Conservative Party.  The town was previously represented by Teresa Gorman from 1987 to 2001, a Conservative rebel who had the whip withdrawn for opposing the Maastricht Treaty. Her predecessor, the Conservative MP Harvey Proctor, was prominent in the news in 1987, when he was charged with indecency.

Local government
Billericay is part of the Basildon district. Basildon District Council is Conservative-controlled. Billericay is served by a town council of 20 members elected in 3 wards. There is also a youth town council, elected in schools around the town. The town council has powers related to local planning and finance, while the youth council has an annual budget of £500 to spend or invest in local services or entertainment.

In 2021 the Billericay Town Council moved to its new home, The Chantry Centre, a purpose-built community facility. As well as  housing the Town Council and its staff it provides meeting rooms and a large hall with full equipped kitchen for hire 

Billericay parish was not formed until 1937; before then, the area had been part of the ancient Great Burstead parish. In 1894, Billericay Rural District was created, which covered a wide area stretching as far as Brentwood and Pitsea. In 1934, the core of this district around Basildon and Billericay became Billericay Urban District and, in 1937, a Billericay civil parish was created covering the same area. The urban district, but not the parish, was renamed Basildon in 1955. In 1974, the district was abolished and became the present-day Basildon district.

Transport

Billericay is a part of the London commuter belt.

It is served by Billericay railway station on the Abellio Greater Anglia route between London Liverpool Street and Southend Victoria. 

The station connects to local bus routes, including First Essex's route 100 which operates between Lakeside Shopping Centre, Basildon and Chelmsford.

Billericay is close to two primary routes: the A12 to the north and the A127 in the south.  The A176 provides a road link to Basildon to the south of Billericay, as well as to the A127.  The only secondary road in the town, the B1007, passes from just south of the town centre as Laindon Road, then meets the A129 at Sun Corner, continues northwards as Billericay's High Street and then Stock Road. It continues north to Chelmsford. Along its route is the village of Stock and an interchange to the A12.  The town is a destination on the A129, linking it to the neighbouring towns of Brentwood and Wickford.

Sport

Billericay Town Football Club 
Billericay Rugby Football Club
Essex Spartans
Mayflower Archers
Billericay Striders Running Club

Culture and trivia
 
Billericay is served by a community radio station, Phoenix FM, which is based in Brentwood.

The town was mentioned in the Ian Dury song "Billericay Dickie".  

Billericay is the setting of the BBC sitcom Gavin & Stacey as the home of Gavin Shipman (Mathew Horne) and his parents; however, the actual filming took place in Wales.

The Cater Museum, a charity, is a local history museum containing artefacts recording the lives of people in the area. It is housed in an 18th and 19th-century Grade II listed building on the High Street.

The Billericay Community Archive strives to record photos, memories and history relating to the town and surrounding areas on their website.

Billericay's commercial cinema "The Ritz" closed its doors in 1971. However, in 2015, the Billericay Community Cinema was established. Less than a year after it started, the not-for-profit, volunteer-based group won a national award: the "Best New Film Society" at the Cinema for All Community Cinema Awards.

Twinning
Billericay is twinned with:

Notable people

 Neal Asher, science fiction writer, born in Billericay
 Francis Thomas Bacon, engineer, born in Billericay
 Lee Barnard, footballer, went to school in Billericay
 Peter Bone, politician, born in Billericay
 Nick Cater, author and journalist in Australia, born in Billericay
 Daniel Corbett, TV weather forecaster, lived in Billericay as a child
 Robert Denmark, middle- and long-distance athlete
 Justin Edinburgh, footballer, lived in Billericay, played for and managed Billericay Town F.C.
 Lee Evans, comedian, went to school and lives in Billericay
 Mark Foster, swimmer, born in Billericay
 David Gandy, model, born and went to school in Billericay
 Teresa Gorman, politician, former Member of Parliament
 Lee Harrison, footballer, born in Billericay
 Chris Haywood, actor/producer, born in Billericay
 David Hopwood, banker, born in Billericay
 Ralph Izzard,  journalist, born in Billericay
 Perry McCarthy, racing driver
 Suzanne Maddock, actor, lives in Billericay
 Christopher Martin, Mayflower pilgrim, lived in Billericay
 Alison Moyet, pop singer, born in Billericay
 Richard Osman, TV personality ("Pointless Friend" on BBC show Pointless), born in Billericay
 Kevin Painter, darts player, born in Billericay
 Paul Parker, was raised in Billericay and lived there when he became a professional footballer
 Gemma Ray, musician, singer, composer and producer, raised in Billericay
 Charlie Richardson, gangster, lived in Billericay
 Stewart Robson, footballer, born in Billericay
 Joseph Thornton, 19th-century Oxford-based bookseller, born in Billericay
 Russell Tovey, actor, has Billericay as his hometown
 Patrick W. Welch, painter, born in Billericay
 Charlie Wernham, comedian and comedy actor, born and lives in Billericay
 Ben Wheatley, film director, born in Billericay

References

External links

The Billericay Society
Billericay Community Archive – Preserving Memories of an Essex Town

 
Towns in Essex
Market towns in Essex
Civil parishes in Essex
Borough of Basildon